Spike: Old Wounds is a comic based on the Angel television series.

Story description

Summary

A retired L.A. detective arrives at Wolfram and Hart and says that Spike had been responsible for a murder that took place decades previously. Spike attempts to solve one of the most infamous unsolved crimes that has taken place in LA history. Meanwhile there are various monster-slayings for the gang to solve.

Expanded overview

An elderly man - former LAPD Detective McNeal - 
holds Winifred Burkle hostage and makes it deep into Wolfram & Hart. Or so he thinks, as he is easily intimidate into giving up. Angel grants him five minutes anyway. He says that he's been working on an unsolved murder for decades: Elizabeth Short, the case known as the Black Dahlia.

He explains that he had fingerprints taken from the letters the killer wrote to the press, and eyewitnesses who saw the killer with the victim just days before the body was found. The suspect had vanished shortly thereafter, but a tipster has recently informed McNeal that he is back, and somehow hasn't aged a day. What's more, the suspect is a Wolfram and Hart employee. McNeal shows Angel a picture of the suspect: Spike. At that moment, Spike arrives. Angel immediately questions him about his whereabouts in 1947. Offended at the line of questioning, Spike throws a chair through the window and leaps out after it.

Later that night, Fred is arriving at her apartment when Spike approaches, asking for her help. He says that Fred is smarter than he is, and that he's not the killer. Fred replies that she believes him, and invites him inside her apartment. Spike begins to tell her what he was doing in L.A. in 1947.

In the aftermath of World War II, Spike decided that Europe should be avoided and headed to the western United States, mainly out of curiosity. He eventually was hired by the head of a large movie studio, Norris Lawrence, to act as a sort of bodyguard. Lawrence had a taste for young women from the poor end of town, and needed protection from the occasional angry mob of family members that would come after him. Lawrence also knew that Spike was a vampire, but seemed not to be worried. Spike enjoyed his job a great deal; he was very well-paid, could perform the acts of violence that came so naturally to him, and had access to gorgeous women for him to kill. Lawrence also employed a police officer by the name of Emigh, whose job it was to prevent Lawrence from being connected to Spike's victims.

Fred is shocked by the discussion of Spike's murders, but Spike points out that he never claimed to be a "Boy Scout" in those days, and that Angel was once a killer too. He adds, "none o' us ever asked for this life, y'know, luv. Everybody forgets that. Sometimes we even do." Spike then resumes his story.

As time passed, Lawrence's habits became odder. He began staging mock sacrifices, using actresses from his studio and prop knives. At one of these events, Emigh contacted Spike, telling him to meet the next night at his office at the police station. At the meeting, Emigh showed Spike a file containing blank sheets of paper, along with a flyer for a wrestling match. The families of some of the people Spike had beaten for Lawrence had called Los Hermanos Numeros, the Mexican luchadores seen in "The Cautionary Tale of Numero Cinco." Incredulous that Emigh would think Spike would feel threatened by a band of Mexican wrestlers, Spike left. As he departed, Spike was attacked and soundly defeated by Los Hermanos Numeros. Cornered, Spike ran, and decided to leave L.A. for good.

Spike and Fred decide to go to McNeal's home to speak with him. When they arrive, they find that the door has been forced open, and that Spike can enter uninvited. Inside, they find that McNeal has been murdered in a fashion identical to the original Black Dahlia victim. Fred notes that McNeal must have been killed very recently, when Spike was still at her apartment. Searching for clues, Spike finds a drawing of a tattoo that Lawrence had on his wrist back in 1947. Fred notes that the same marking was found on Elizabeth Short's body. Spike also finds information on Emigh. He and Fred learn that Emigh is now 97 years old and living in a geriatric home. Spike asks Fred to return to Wolfram and Hart to follow up on the tattoo lead while he visits Emigh. As they leave, Spike notices a letter in McNeal's trash and secretly pockets it.

At Wolfram and Hart, Fred discovers that the tattoo is not a tattoo at all, and rushes to call Angel for help. Spike, meanwhile, visits Emigh and asks him to come help clear his name. Emigh replies that he's not going anywhere, and transforms into a demon. He explains that Lawrence's tattoo is actually a brand that signifies fealty; "Emigh" had cast a charm on Lawrence making him attractive to women. Every once in a while, Emigh would take one of the women for himself. As Lawrence got sloppier, Emigh decided to use Spike as a scapegoat. He wrote the Black Dahlia letters to the press on the blank papers Spike had handled in Emigh's office, thinking that the fingerprints of a dead man would be the perfect red herring. Finally, Emigh declares that he wants a new host body; he begins to burn his brand into Spike's chest and tells Spike he will be paralyzed soon. Spike replies that Emigh's toxin will have no effect on him since his heart doesn't pump and the poison won't travel; he proceeds to defeat the demon. At that moment, Angel, Gunn, Wesley, and Lorne arrive, too late to join the battle.

Later, Fred tells Spike that the brand on his chest is already beginning to heal over. She explains that Emigh was a Kandarian predator demon, which has to live out its host's full lifespan before it can find another. Spike promises Fred that he will always come through for her in the future.

Eve enters Angel's office, and finds Spike sitting in Angel's chair. Spike reveals that the letter he had taken from McNeal's office was the tip that McNeal had mentioned earlier. Spike had threatened a post office worker into revealing that the letter's origin was Wolfram and Hart. Spike guesses that the Senior Partners are worried that Spike's presence may interfere with their plans for Angel, and had hoped that McNeal would simply stake Spike. Spike tells Eve to leave him out of any plans in the future, driving home his point with a knife thrown into the wall beside Eve's head.

Spike meets Angel, Wesley, and Gunn in the Wolfram and Hart offices. When Wesley asks about the burn, Spike berates the group for condemning him when McNeal made his accusation, and tells them that their positions and Wolfram and Hart are costing them their souls. As he exits, he says, "so much for redemption, eh?"

Continuity

Set at some point during Angel season 5. The comic reveals some of what Spike was up to in 1947.
Spike reveals that he knew about Los Hermanos Numeros prior to their appearance in "The Cautionary Tale of Numero Cinco". When Fred asks him why he didn't say anything earlier, Spike replies, "I don't have to tell Captain Forehead everything that's ever happened to me. I was just enjoying watching the crotchety old coot kick his arse."

Canonical issues

Angel comics such as this one are not usually considered by fans as canonical. Some fans consider them stories from the imaginations of authors and artists, while other fans consider them as taking place in an alternative fictional reality. However unlike fan fiction, overviews summarising their story, written early in the writing process, were 'approved' by both Fox and Joss Whedon (or his office), and the books were therefore later published as officially Buffy merchandise.

External links
Moviepoopshoot.com - COMICS 101 with Scott Tipton - Tipton explains how he got to write and draw the Spike one-shot alongside various artwork from the comic.

Angel (1999 TV series) comics
One-shot comic titles